Isaac René Guy Le Chapelier (12 June 1754 – 22 April 1794) was a French jurist and politician of the Revolutionary period.

Biography
Le Chapelier was born in Rennes in Brittany, where his father was bâtonnier of the corporation of lawyers, a title equivalent to President of the Bar. He entered the law profession, and was a noted orator. In 1775, Le Chapelier was initiated as a freemason at the Grand Orient de France.

In 1789 he was elected as a deputy to the Estates General by the Third Estate of the sénéchaussée of Rennes. He adopted radical opinions. His influence in the National Constituent Assembly was considerable: he served as president 3–17 August 1789, presiding over the famous all-night session of 4–5 August, during which feudalism was abolished in France, and in late September 1789 was added to the Constitutional Committee, where he drafted much of the Constitution of 1791.

Le Chapelier introduced a motion in the National Assembly which prohibited guilds, trade unions, and compagnonnage, and which also abolished the right to strike. Le Chapelier and other Jacobins interpreted demands by Paris workers for higher wages as contrary to the new principles of the Revolution. The measure was enacted law on 14 June 1791 in what became subsequently known as the Le Chapelier Law. The law effectively barred guilds and trade unions in France until 1864.

In May, 1789, when the Estates General were still meeting, Le Chapelier was one of the founders of the Breton Club, a collection of deputies initially all hailing from his home province of Brittany, but which in the weeks to come drew all sorts of deputies sharing a more radical ideology. After the October Days (5–6 October) and the National Assembly's move to Paris, the Breton Club rented a Dominican monastery and became the Jacobin Club, of which Le Chapelier was the first president.

Like many radical deputies, Le Chapelier wished for the central role played by such popular societies early in the French Revolution to come to an end with the settling of the state and the pending promulgation of a new constitution. This conviction was increased by the Champs de Mars Massacre of 17 July 1791. Within days, Le Chapelier joined the mass exodus of moderate deputies abandoning the Jacobin club in favour of a new organisation, the Patriotic Society of 1789 and later the Feuillant club.

Le Chapelier, in his capacity as chairman of the Constitutional Committee, presented to the National Assembly in its final sessions a law restricting the rights of popular societies to undertake concerted political action, including the right to correspond with one another. It passed 30 September 1791. By the virtue of obeying this law, the moderate Feuillants embraced obsolescence; the radical Jacobins, by ignoring it, emerged as the most vital political force of the French Revolution. The popular society movement, largely founded by Le Chapelier, was thus inadvertently radicalised contrary to his original intentions.

During the Reign of Terror, as a suspect for having had links with the Feuillants, he temporarily emigrated to Great Britain, but returned to France in 1794, in an unsuccessful effort to prevent the confiscation of his assets. He was arrested, and guillotined in Paris on the same day as Guillaume-Chrétien de Lamoignon de Malesherbes.

In popular culture

He is a character in Rafael Sabatini's historical novels Scaramouche (1921) and Scaramouche the King-Maker (1931).

References

Lucien Jaume, "Le citoyen sans les corps intermédiaires: discours de Le Chapelier", in Cahiers du Cevipof, Nr. 39, April 2005, pp. 30–40

1754 births
1794 deaths
18th-century French lawyers
18th-century French politicians
Politicians from Rennes
French people executed by guillotine during the French Revolution
University of Rennes alumni